Lodewyk Joseph Jurgens 'Lood' Muller  (5 July 1959 – 24 May 2018) was a South African rugby union player, who played tighthead prop.

Playing career
Muller played his provincial rugby for Natal and was almost thirty years old when he made his debut for Natal in 1989. In 1990 he suffered a neck injury and missed out on Natal's first Currie Cup title in 1990, but he was a member of the Natal team that won the Currie Cup in 1992.

Muller made his test debut for the Springboks in 1992 against New Zealand at Ellis Park in Johannesburg.

Test history

See also
List of South Africa national rugby union players – Springbok no. 563

References

1959 births
2018 deaths
Rugby union players from Pietermaritzburg
South Africa international rugby union players
South African rugby union players
Rugby union props
Sharks (Currie Cup) players